Keith Urgo is an American college basketball coach who is the head coach of the Fordham Rams men's basketball program in the Atlantic 10 Conference.

Early years and playing career
Urgo was born in Washington D.C. the 8th of 10 children to parents originally from Brooklyn; his father attended Fordham. Urgo attended Gonzaga College High School. For college, he attended Fairfield University where he was a dual sport athlete, playing basketball and lacrosse.

Coaching career
After graduating from college, Urgo founded the non-profit organization, Playing for Peace. He began his coaching career in 2004 as an assistant coach for Gonzaga College High School, his former high school before leaving in 2008 for Villanova, where he started off as a video assistant before becoming the teams director of basketball operations. In 2012 he was hired by Penn State, where he served as an assistant head coach for 10 years. In 2021 he was hired as the associate head coach for Fordham under Kyle Neptune.

On April 28, 2022 Urgo was named the head coach of Fordham following the departure of Neptune to Villanova.

Head coaching record

References

1980 births
Living people
American men's basketball coaches
American men's basketball players
College men's basketball head coaches in the United States
Fairfield Stags men's basketball players
Fordham Rams men's basketball coaches
Penn State Nittany Lions basketball coaches
Villanova Wildcats men's basketball coaches